Abdul Nafiu Idrissu (born June 12, 1991, in Tamale) is a Ghanaian football striker who currently plays for SM Sanga Balende.

Career
Idrissu played professional for Sharjah FC.

Notes 

1986 births
Living people
Ghanaian footballers
Association football forwards
ASEC Mimosas players
Expatriate footballers in Ivory Coast
Expatriate footballers in the United Arab Emirates
West African Football Academy players
Ghanaian expatriate sportspeople in Ivory Coast
People from Tamale, Ghana